Pierre Lemonnier (aka Petro Lemonnier) (28 June 1675 in Saint-Sever – 27 November 1757 in Saint-Germain-en-Laye) was a French astronomer, a professor of Physics and Philosophy at the Collège d'Harcourt (University of Paris), and a member of the French Academy of Sciences.

Lemonnier published the 6-volume Latin university textbook Cursus philosophicus ad scholarum usum accommodatus (Paris, 1750/1754) which consisted of the following volumes (generally consistent with the Ratio Studiorum):
 Volume 1 - Logica
 Volume 2 - Metaphysica
 Volume 3 - Physica Generalis including mechanics and geometry
 Volume 4 - Physica Particularis (Part I) including astronomy (Ptolemaic, Copernican, Tychonic), optics, chemistry, gravity, and Newtonian versus Cartesian dynamics
 Volume 5 - Physica Particularis (Part II) including fluid mechanics, human anatomy, magnetism, and miscellaneous subjects (earthquakes, electricity, botany, metallurgy, etc. ...)
 Volume 6 - Moralis including appendices on trigonometry and sundials

He was also the father of Pierre Charles Le Monnier and Louis-Guillaume Le Monnier.

See also 
 Johann Baptiste Horvath
 Andreas Jaszlinszky
 Edmond Pourchot
 Philip of the Blessed Trinity
 Charles Morton

References 

1675 births
1757 deaths
Members of the French Academy of Sciences
18th-century Latin-language writers
18th-century French male writers
18th-century French physicists
18th-century French astronomers